Xandra is a given name or a nickname for Alexandra (alternate spelling Zandra). Xandra (Zandra) is the feminine equivalent of Xander (Zander).

 Xandra (band), a Dutch musical group fronted by Dutch singer Sandra Reemer representing Netherlands in the Eurovision Song Contest in 1979
Xandra no Daibōken: Valkyrie to no Deai, (literally Xandra's Great Adventure: Encounter with the Valkyrie), an action-adventure platform game featuring character Krino Sandra (romanized as Xandra)
Xandra, a character played by Sheryl Cruz in Komiks Presents: Varga
Xandra, a fictional character in Doom 2099
 Xandra (business), a global conversation design studio formed in Australia in 2016.  Expanded to Los Angeles in 2017.
Xandra, Goddess of Adventure, a fictional character in Legend of the Three Caballeros
Xandra, a Xweetok from Neopets

See also
Xander
Sandra (given name)
Sander (name)
Alexandra